Aşağıokçular is a village in the Çanakkale District of Çanakkale Province in Turkey. Its population is 259 (2021).

References

Villages in Çanakkale District